The quillback (Carpiodes cyprinus), also known as the quillback carpsucker, is a type of freshwater fish of the sucker family widely distributed throughout North America.  It is deeper-bodied than most suckers, leading to a carplike appearance. However, the quillback is not a carp. It can be distinguished from carp by the lack of barbels around the mouth. The quillback is long-lived, with age up to 30 years, 44 years, and 52 years documented across different studies.

Physical description
The quillback is a medium-sized, deep-bodied fish found throughout North America. It has a small head, humped back and deeply forked caudal fin. The compressed body of the quillback makes it look flattened when viewed from the side. The quillback has a subterminal mouth with no barbels, and no nipple-like protrusions on the bottom lip. It has large, reflective, silver cycloid scales that are responsible for giving the quillback its characteristic silver color. They have a white belly with yellow or orange lower fins. The tail and dorsal fin are usually gray or silver. The quillback gets its name from the long quill that is formed via the first several fin rays of the dorsal fin. Quillback are typically 15–20 inches on average, weighing between 1 and 4 pounds. However, they can grow up to 26 inches and weigh 10 pounds. The quillback has a nearly straight, hyper-sensitive lateral line, composed of at least 37 lateral line scales. This helps the fish locate predators and prey.

Distribution, habitat and diet
The quillback is found throughout much of North America, from Saskatchewan to Florida, and from South Dakota to Alabama. The quillback occupies temperate, freshwater habitats. This includes many streams, lakes, channels and rivers. They prefer water that is clear, slow moving, highly productive and moderately deep. The quillback can commonly be found in the Hudson Bay, the Mississippi River basin, the Great Lakes, and drainages from the Delaware, Apalachicola, and Pearl rivers. They often comprise a large portion of the biomass of warmwater rivers, but they are very difficult to catch with traditional American angling methods. The quillback carpsucker is closely related to the highfin carpsucker and the river carpsucker.  All three species are rarely caught by anglers due to their feeding habits, but they have been caught occasionally on worms, minnows, and artificial lures.

Quillbacks usually feed in schools. They are omnivores and bottom feeders that prefer lakes, rivers and streams in which the water is clear at the bottom. The school of quillbacks move slowly over a sand or gravel bottom when they eat. Their typical diet consists of insect larvae, crustaceans, molluscs, protozoa and various aquatic vegetation,  including algae and leaves.

Life history

The quillback is a slow-paced and long-lived freshwater fish species that belongs to a subfamily (Ictiobinae) for which extremely long-lived fishes are becoming known. A study of a Minnesota population found that they may reach sexual maturity by age 8–9 years, live several decades at adult size, recruit more sporadically than previously realized, and attain longevity in excess of 40 years. The study also documented accrual of age-spot pigmentation after 30 years, similar to their larger-bodied cousins, the bigmouth buffalo.

Reproduction
The quillback reproduces once yearly, typically in late spring or early summer. The timing of reproduction depends on the water temperature. Ideal temperatures for reproduction are between 7–18 degrees Celsius. Spawning occurs upstream of the typical quillback habitat, and they migrate in schools to the spawning site. The female quillback produces between 15,000 and 60,000 eggs, and scatters them in shallow water over a sandy or mud bottom. Fertilization then happens externally, and the eggs are left in quiet water. Since the quillback is oviparous, the eggs are hatched outside of the fish's body. The quillback possesses a polygynandrous mating system, meaning that two or more males have an exclusive sexual relationship with two or more females. The numbers of each sex can vary, and do not need to be equal.

Relationship with humans
The quillback is currently at risk for extinction in various states throughout the continental United States including Vermont, New York and Michigan. Other places prove vulnerability to the species including Alberta, Saskatchewan, Quebec, South Dakota, Kansas, Oklahoma, Arkansas, Louisiana and North Carolina. Unmanaged and unregulated modern bowfishing also poses a threat to this species across their USA range, including Minnesota. Quillbacks benefit the ecosystem they reside in because they are bottom feeders. Bottom feeders help keep their natural environment clean by feeding on the material at the bottom of the habitat. The quillback has an economic benefit to Mexico. The IGFA world record for the species stands at 8lb 1oz taken from Lake Manitoba in Canada in 2016.

References

Carpiodes
Freshwater fish of North America
Fish described in 1817